A Bright World was a Chinese talk show based on the popular South Korean talk show Non-Summit. It aired on Jiangsu Television on Thursday at 22:00 beginning April 16, 2015. The show hosts a panel of foreigners living in China, holding discussions in Mandarin on various topics and issues. The atmosphere is meant to emulate a meeting of world leaders, but presented with humor.

The panel consisted of a “Secretary General", a "Vice Secretary General", and 11 "representatives" from different countries known as TK11. In Season 1, there were 11 TK11 representatives. In Season 2, there were 16 TK11 representatives. Every episode 11 of them sit in the middle, and the other 5 sit in the audience area.

Series overview

Representatives

Current representatives

Past Representatives

Guest Representatives

Similar Shows

South Korean shows

Non-summit is the original show.
 In 2015, a Non-summit spin-off aired.

Turkish franchise

In 2014, atv purchased the rights for a Turkish adaptation of Non-Summit, titled Elİn Oğlu, which premiered on 21 March 2015.

Chinese franchises

Informal Talks (非正式会谈) is a Chinese adaptation of Non-Summit, broadcast on Hubei Television. It began its second season in December, 2015.

References

External links
 

2015 Chinese television series debuts
Chinese-language television shows
Chinese television talk shows
Non-Summit
Chinese television series based on South Korean television series